Hajjiabad (also Romanized as Ḩājjīābād and Hājīābād; also known as Ḩājjīābād-e ‘Olyā) is a village in Hakimabad Rural District, in the Central District of Zarandieh County, Markazi Province, Iran. At the 2006 census, its population was 31, in 9 families.

References 

Populated places in Zarandieh County